Teuscher is a chocolatier headquartered in Zurich, Switzerland.

Teuscher's main store is on Zurich's famed Bahnhofstrasse.  The flagship store is a few blocks away in Zurich's old city centre (Storchengasse 9) in a shop built in 1647.

Founded in 1932 by Dolf Teuscher, Sr., Teuscher is now run by Dolf Teuscher, Jr.  The company's CFO is Rafael Rubio, Dolf Jr.'s nephew.

In addition to its stores in Zurich, the company has outlets in Geneva, New York City, Boston, Philadelphia, Chicago, Portland, San Francisco, Beverly Hills, Seoul, Abu Dhabi. The Swiss confectioner hand manufactures over 200 varieties of confections and pastries.  Its signature confections are Champagne Truffles, the first of its kind.  They are made with champagne, butter cream, and surrounded by dark cream ganache made from 66% dark base chocolate. Each is enrobed in milk chocolate and dusted with confectioner's sugar, or dark chocolate and dusted with bracingly dry unsweetened cocoa powder.

As Swiss confectioners generally do not distinguish themselves from patisseries, the Teuscher brand also creates a wide range of pastries and cookies.  Controversially, the Zurich-based company bakes the famous cookies of Basel, Zurich's main rival city, the Basler Leckerli, which are somewhat similar to gingerbread cookies.

Aside from a wide-ranging selection of truffles, pralines, marzipan and other items, Teuscher also manufactures dark chocolate ranging from 55% to 99% in increments of 11%.

See also
 List of bean-to-bar chocolate manufacturers

References

External links
Official site

Swiss chocolate companies